Pasto is the capital of the department of Nariño, in southern Colombia.

Pasto may also refer to:

Places 
 Pasto, Aibonito, Puerto Rico
 Pasto, Coamo, Puerto Rico
 Pasto, Guayanilla, Puerto Rico
 Pasto, Morovis, Puerto Rico

Other uses 
 , an ethnic group of Colombia and Ecuador
 Pasto language, the extinct language associated with them
 Pasto (album), an album by Argentine rock group Babasónicos

See also 
 Impasto
 
 Pasto-1, an Indonesian music group
 Pashto